Rice Lake State Fish and Wildlife Area is an Illinois state park on  in Fulton County, Illinois, United States.

References

External links

State parks of Illinois
Protected areas of Fulton County, Illinois
Lakes of Illinois
Protected areas established in 1945
Landforms of Fulton County, Illinois
1945 establishments in Illinois